Herbert II may refer to:

 Herbert II, Count of Vermandois (884–943)
 Herbert II, Count of Maine (died in 1062)